Brendan Moar is an Australian television host, best known for hosting several lifestyle genre shows on Foxtel, and being the host on the Foxtel program Dry Spell Gardening.

Career
Moar began hosting Foxtel's Dry Spell Gardening in 2008. He was also the chief landscaper designer of the show. It aired on the Lifestyle Channel. He also hosted several other lifestyle programs on Foxtel, including By Design, Home, Moar Gardening and Postcards from Home.

In 2011, he made his free to air debut as host of The Renovators, that aired on Channel Ten.

He has twice been voted Favourite Male Subscription Television Presenter at the ASTRA Awards.

Moar is the gardening editor for Inside Out magazine and has released his first book, Grounded, a companion to the Moar Gardening television series.

References

Australian television presenters
Australian gardeners
Australian landscape or garden designers
Year of birth missing (living people)
Living people